Sandip University, Sijoul is a private university located in Sijoul, Madhubani district, Bihar, India. The university was established in 2017 by Sandip Foundation under the Bihar Private Universities Act, 2013,  one of the two first private universities in Bihar, the other being K. K. University. Both universities were approved by the Bihar Government in May 2017 following the passing of Private Universities (Amendment) Bill, 2017 in March 2017 which relaxed the rules for establishment of private universities in Bihar. This decision gave autonomous status to what was previously the Sandip Foundation Sijoul campus which houses the Shri Nityanand Jha College of Education (SNJCOE) and the Shri Ram Polytechnic (SRP). This is the second university to be established by the foundation, following the establishment  Sandip University, Nashik in 2015.

Schools 

 School of Engineering & Technology
 School of  Computing Sciences & Engineering
 School of Commerce & Management Studies
 School of Sciences
 School of Education

References

External links
 

Madhubani district
Universities in Bihar
Educational institutions established in 2017
2017 establishments in Bihar
Private universities in India